P. Asayan (born 1957) was an Indian politician and former Member of the Legislative Assembly of Tamil Nadu.  He was elected to the Tamil Nadu legislative assembly as a Dravida Munnetra Kazhagam candidate from Andipatti constituency in 1989 and 1996 elections.

References 

Dravida Munnetra Kazhagam politicians
Living people
1957 births
Tamil Nadu MLAs 1996–2001